Silver City is a settlement in Christmas Island, Australia. It is not far from the capital, Flying Fish Cove. In the population there are Chinese, European and a minority of Malays. The settlement was founded in the 1970s, and the houses were built with aluminum and other metals with the intention of being able to withstand cyclones. In the settlement, there are also large houses made in the contemporary Australian style.

References

Populated places in Christmas Island